Dolichopus clavipes is a species of fly in the family Dolichopodidae. It is found in the  Palearctic .

Subspecies
There are two subspecies of D. clavipes:

D. clavipes clavipes Haliday, 1832
D. clavipes fusiformis Becker, 1917 (formerly an independent species)

References

External links
Images representing Dolichopus at BOLD

clavipes
Insects described in 1832
Asilomorph flies of Europe
Taxa named by Alexander Henry Haliday